Patrick Justin Rowe (born 28 January 2001) is  an Australian cricketer. A right handed batsman and wicket-keeper, Rowe plays for St Kilda Cricket Club and is a member of the Victoria squad.

Rowe made his first-class debut on 11 December 2020 for Australia A as a concussion substitute for Cameron Green against a touring India side at the SCG after Green was struck on the head in his follow-through whilst bowling from a drive by Jasprit Bumrah. Prior to his first-class debut, he was named in Australia's squads for the 2018 Under-19 Cricket World Cup and the 2020 Under-19 Cricket World Cup. He made his Twenty20 debut on 3 January 2022, for the Melbourne Stars in the 2021–22 Big Bash League season.

References

External links
 

Australian cricketers
2001 births
Living people
Place of birth missing (living people)
Melbourne Stars cricketers